The Wolseley 14/60 is an automobile that was produced by Wolseley Motors in the United Kingdom between 1938 and 1948.

Introduced in 1938 as part of the Wolseley Series III range, the 14/60 was built on a 104¾ inch wheelbase and was powered by a 60 bhp, twin carburettor, inline six-cylinder engine. It shared its styling with the Wolseley 12/48 which was introduced in 1937. The 14/60 was offered as a four door saloon  with a small number of ‘Redfern’ tourers also produced.

Post-war production commenced in 1945 and totalled 5,731 vehicles.

References

14 60
Cars introduced in 1938
1940s cars
Sedans
Rear-wheel-drive vehicles
Convertibles